

Incumbents
President: Heinz Fischer
Chancellor: Werner Faymann

Governors
Burgenland: Hans Niessl 
Carinthia: Gerhard Dörfler (until 28 March); Peter Kaiser (from 28 March)
Lower Austria: Erwin Pröll 
Salzburg: Gabi Burgstaller (until 19 June); Wilfried Haslauer Jr. (from 19 June)
Styria: Franz Voves 
Tyrol: Günther Platter
Upper Austria: Josef Pühringer
Vienna: Michael Häupl 
Vorarlberg: Markus Wallner

Events
January 21 - Two Vienna S-Bahn trains packed with morning commuters collided on a single-track stretch of line between Hütteldorf and Penzing in Vienna's suburbs in eastern Austria, leaving 41 people injured, five of them seriously. Among the injured was the driver of one of the trains. Both trains were operating the Line S45 service, and both trains were made up of 4024-series rolling stock.

References

 
2010s in Austria
Years of the 21st century in Austria
Austria